Greatwood And Cliff Copses are two wooded areas totalling 16.3 hectares which are a Site of special scientific interest to the southwest of Shanklin. The site was notified in 1986 for its biological features.

References

Natural England citation sheet

Sites of Special Scientific Interest on the Isle of Wight